Peru Progressing was a minor Peruvian political party. Founded in December 2015 by businessman Manuel Ponce Ayala, the party launched Miguel Hilario, an academic of Shipibo-Konibo descent, as its presidential nominee.

At the general election held on April 10, 2016, the party's ticket won 0.5% of the popular vote, placing ninth. At congressional level, the party won 0.1% and no seats in the Congress of the Republic. The party was subsequently cancelled by the National Elections Jury in July 2017 along with the other parties that failed to pass the electoral threshold.

Election results

Presidential election

Elections to the Congress of the Republic

References

Defunct political parties in Peru